Bob and Mike Bryan were the two-time defending champions, but lost in the second round to Juan Sebastián Cabal and Robert Farah.

Pierre-Hugues Herbert and Nicolas Mahut won the title, defeating Jamie Murray and Bruno Soares in the final, 4–6, 6–0, [10–6].

Seeds
All seeds received a bye into the second round.

Draw

Finals

Top half

Bottom half

References
 Main Draw

Doubles